Kitsilano is a neighbourhood located in the city of Vancouver, British Columbia, Canada. Kitsilano is named after Squamish chief August Jack Khatsahlano, and the neighbourhood is located in Vancouver's West Side along the south shore of English Bay, between the neighbourhoods of West Point Grey and Fairview. The area is mostly residential with two main commercial areas, West 4th Avenue and West Broadway, known for their retail stores, restaurants and organic food markets.

History

Pre-colonial history 
The area has been home to the Squamish people for thousands of years, sharing the territory with the Musqueam and the Tsleil-Waututh Peoples. All three Nations moved throughout their shared traditional territory, using the resources it provided for fishing, hunting, trapping and gathering.

Post-colonial history 
In 1911, an amendment to the Indian Act by the federal government to legalize the unsettling of reserves stated that "an Indian reserve which adjoins or is situated wholly or partly within an incorporated town or city having a population of [more] than eight thousand", could at the recommendation of the Superintendent General be removed without their consent if it was "having regard to the interest of the public" without the need for consent from the reserve's residents.  

Subsequently, both provincial and federal governments began the "unsettling of reserves" process, which was the "emptying" of the reserves that "be[came] a source of nuisance and an impediment to progress", or, in other words, the government unsettled reserves for growing cities and potential business ventures; and by the end of 1911 the reserve was sold to the Government of British Columbia. At this time in Canadian history, the federal government had already isolated the Indigenous population on to morsels of reserve lands, only to further deprive Indigenous peoples of what the government first thought was negligible land. 

The Squamish Nation formally surrendered the majority of reserve to the federal government in 1946. Part of the expropriated land was used by the Canadian Pacific Railway who pursued selling the land they had deed to in the 1980s despite the original agreement with the Squamish Nation that they should regain control of the land. This went to court, and in August 2002 the BC Court of Appeals upheld a lower court's ruling in favour of the Squamish. This Indian reserve land is at the foot of the Burrard Street Bridge, called Senakw (commonly spelled Snauq historically) in the Squamish language, and sənaʔqʷ in the Musqueam people's hən'q'əmin'əm' language, where August Jack Khatsahlano lived.

The forced relocation of the Musqueam Nation by the Canadian government resulted in a Musqueam Reserve created on the north arm of the Fraser River. The Squamish Nation was forcibly relocated to reserves on the north shore of Burrard Inlet, currently the cities North Vancouver and West Vancouver, as well as the False Creek Indian Reserve No. 6.

False Creek Indian Reserve No. 6 

The False Creek Indian Reserve No. 6, also known as the Kitsilano Indian Reserve, is an Indian Reserve developed by the colonial government in 1869. The reserve is located on the former site of a Squamish village, known as "sən’a?qw" in hən’q’emin’əm’, the language of the Musqueam people, and as "Sen’ákw" in Skwxwú7mesh, the language of the Squamish people. Inside the reserve there was a large longhouse that housed families, held potlach ceremonies, and became a central point of trade. The land appealed to its residents and attracted settlers by providing access to natural resources. It served as an important fishing area where inhabitants could set up tidal weirs of vine maple fencing and nettle fibre nets to catch fish. Additionally, the Squamish people cultivated an orchard as well as cherry trees on this land. Between 1869 and 1965, as the development of railway lines drew attention to the reserve, the Burrard Street Bridge and various leases began to occupy the reserve land. The land set aside for the Squamish people was continually appropriated until it was completely sold off. After decades of legal proceedings, the Squamish Nation reclaimed a small amount of the reserve land in 2002.

Settler history 

The city's streetcar lines used to have a "loop" at Arbutus & Cornwall, which made "Greer's Beach", as the area first became known after the holdout settler who lived there, easy to get to from the new city, then still mostly contained on the downtown peninsula. With the opening of the Lulu Island Railway interurban line from Granville & Pacific  to Richmond via Seventh Avenue and Arbutus Street to Kerrisdale in the 1890s, more of Kitsilano was put within easy range of downtown and housing and commercial areas carved out of the forests and swamp. The lowland area beyond Macdonald, from 4th Avenue to King Edward, was known as Malaria Flats because of its swampy air. Like most of Vancouver, it had only a few decades before been covered in dense West Coast forest.

From the 1890s, the Vancouver Lawn Tennis Club in Granville Park became a trendy club for the local elite, hosting an annual Championship which attracted some nationally successful Canadian players.

Kitsilano was also the site of the second Sikh temple to be built in Canada, a few years after the first opened Golden in 1905. Opened in 1908, the temple served early South Asian settlers who worked at nearby sawmills along false creek at the time.

The area was an inexpensive neighbourhood to live in the 1960s and attracted many from the counterculture  from across Canada and the United States and was known as one of the two hotbeds of the hippie culture in the city, the other being Gastown. However, the area became gentrified by 'yuppies' in subsequent decades. Close proximity to downtown Vancouver, walking distance to parks, beaches and popular Granville Island has made the neighbourhood a very desirable community to live. One of the main concert venues in the city in the days of the counterculture was the Soft Rock Cafe (not to be confused with the Hard Rock Cafe), near 4th and Maple, later rebuilt into a modern shopping complex.

One remaining artifact of the 1960s is the Naam Cafe at 4th and Macdonald, providing vegetarian, vegan, and natural foods. The area is also known for having the first of certain kinds of restaurants, such as the California-style Topanga Cafe. Three of the first neighbourhood pub licenses in Vancouver are still located on 4th Avenue - Bimini's at Maple (reopened after a fire in 2007), Darby D. Dawes at Macdonald, and Jerry's Cove—the original name of Jericho—near Alma.

Greenpeace - founded in the home of Dorothy Stowe at 2775 Courtney Ave. in upper Point Grey near Pacific Spirit Regional Park and UBC - originally found a home in Kitsilano in the backroom of a small office on the SE corner of Broadway at Cypress, and shortly after that at 2007 4th Ave. and Maple (now 2009 due to address change), sharing the upstairs office with SPEC. The first offices of the Green Party of British Columbia were originally located in the home of longtime party leader Adriane Carr and her husband Paul George on Trafalgar Street, near 6th, in early 1983, before being moved by the summer of that year to offices near Broadway and Cypress, which also became the first offices of the Green Party of Canada.

Geography 
Like all of Vancouver, Kitsilano is located in traditional Coast Salish territory. The land that is currently known as Kitsilano has been shared by the Musqueam, Squamish, and Tsleil-Watuth peoples since time immemorial. Thus, their traditional place names are valuable descriptors of this landscape. The area that is currently known as Point Grey is traditionally known as Chitchilayuk. Beaches now known as Spanish Banks is traditionally known as Pookcha, Jericho Beach is traditionally known as Eyalmo and E-Eyalmo, and Kitsilano Beach is traditionally known as Skwa-yoos. The area that is currently Sasamat Street was once known as Kokohpai, while the area of Bayswater Street was called Simsahmuls.

Kitsilano is located in the West Side of Vancouver, along the southern shore of English Bay, with Burrard Street as the neighborhood's eastern boundary, Alma Street its western boundary, and 16th Avenue its southern boundary.

Adjacent neighbourhoods include the West End northeast across the Burrard Bridge and False Creek, Fairview directly to the east, Shaughnessy to the southeast, Arbutus Ridge directly south, Dunbar-Southlands southwest, and West Point Grey directly west.

Demographics 
As of 2016, Kitsilano has 43,045 people. 13.3% of the population is under the age of 20; 40.1% is between 20 and 39; 32.8% is between 40 and 64; and 13.8% is 65 or older. 74.2% of Kitsilano residents speak English as a first language, 5.6% speak a Chinese language, 2.6% speak French and 0.2% speaking hən'q'əmin'əm. The median household income is $72,839 and 14.7% of its population lives in low-income households. The unemployment rate is 5.2%.

Culture & recreation 
Notable landmarks in Kitsilano include the Burrard Bridge, Kitsilano Beach, and the Museum of Vancouver/H. R. MacMillan Space Centre. The Museum of Vancouver has gained several pieces of Northwest Coast from Indigenous artists. Much of the work is displayed in a wide variety of mediums to showcase the Indigenous culture that surrounds this city.

The neighborhood has played host to a number of annual events such as the Vancouver International Children's Festival, the Bard on the Beach outdoor Shakespeare festival, and the Celebration of Light fireworks competition. Indigenous murals can be seen as the connection between the City of Reconciliation and the Musqueam, Squamish, and Tsleil-Waututh First Nations. The goal is to expose the public to the culturally contemporary Indigenous artists that are present in today's society.

Kitsilano is home to a number of Vancouver's annual festivals and events:

 Each June, Greek Day is an annual street festival celebrating Greek culture and cuisine along several blocks of Greek West Broadway, which is Vancouver's Greektown.
 Vanier Park is home to the Vancouver International Children's Festival (at Granville Island as of 2014) and "Bard on the Beach", the outdoor Shakespeare festival.
 The Celebration of Light is held on the waters of English Bay between Vanier Park and the West End.
 The Khatsahlano Street Party is held on 4th Avenue on a July Saturday.

Parks and beaches 
Kitsilano is home to 17 parks, which include six playgrounds, an off-leash dog park, and Kitsilano Beach, one of Vancouver's most popular beaches. Along with the beach itself, Kitsilano Beach Park also contains a franchise restaurant, Kitsilano Pool, and the Kitsilano Showboat. The Kitsilano Showboat, operating since 1935, is essentially an open-air amphitheatre with the ocean and mountains as a backdrop. All summer long, the showboat hosts free performances from local bands, dance groups, and other performers. Its main goal is to entertain residents and tourists, showcasing amateur talent. It is located on the south side of the Kitsilano Pool along Cornwall Avenue. Weather permitting, shows typically start at 7:30 p.m. on Mondays, Wednesday, and Fridays. Beatrice Leinbach, or Captain Bea, has been playing a role in maintaining the showboat since the mid-1940s. As of 2006, she is the president of the non-profit Kitsilano Showboat Society.

As of September 2018, there was an attempt to reconcile with the Indigenous communities whose land was taken during the expansion of Vancouver. By renaming the beaches and parks, one of which included Kitsilano Beach, Stuart Mackinnon park board chairman was going to work with the Musqueam, Squamish, and Tsleil-Waututh Nations to rename those areas after their original Indigenous names. However, the Indigenous community replied by saying the original areas were not named previously, because they were only forests before colonization. As of today no beaches or parks, including Kitsilano Beach have been renamed in the hən'q'əmin'əm' (Musqueam Halkomelem) or Skwxwú7mesh Snichim (Squamish language).

Vanier Park is another one of Kitsilano's most popular parks, and is the location of the Museum of Vancouver, the H. R. MacMillan Space Centre, the Vancouver Maritime Museum, as well as the public art installations Gate to the Northwest Passage by artist Alan Chung Hung and "Freezing Water #7" by Jun Ren.

Buildings 
Landmark buildings in Kitsilano include the Burrard Bridge, a five-lane, Art Deco style, steel truss bridge constructed in 1930-1932 connecting downtown Vancouver with Kitsilano via connections to Burrard Street on both ends, as well as several historic sites such as the Museum of Vancouver and H. R. MacMillan Space Centre, St. Roch National Historic Site of Canada, Kitsilano Secondary School, General Gordon Elementary School and the Bessborough Armoury. Busy Macdonald Street and some quiet, leafy adjoining streets still have some 1910s–1920s craftsman houses that cannot be found anywhere else in Vancouver. According to Exploring Vancouver, an architectural guide to the city:

Government 
Kitsilano is situated within the Canadian federal electoral districts of Vancouver Quadra and Vancouver Centre, currently held by Joyce Murray and Hedy Fry, respectively. Both are members of the Liberal Party of Canada. Provincially, Kitsilano lies within the Legislative Assembly of British Columbia electoral districts of Vancouver-Point Grey, Vancouver-Fairview, and Vancouver-False Creek. Vancouver-Point Grey is currently held by David Eby of the BC NDP, Vancouver-Fairview by fellow BC NDP member George Heyman, and Vancouver-False Creek by BC NDP member Brenda Bailey.

Notable residents 

Kitsilano is the current or former home of a number of notable residents including former Squamish chief August Jack Khatsahlano, environmentalist David Suzuki, writers William Gibson and Philip K. Dick, actors Ryan Reynolds, Jason Priestley, and Joshua Jackson, ice hockey players Trevor Linden and Ryan Kesler, and comedian Brent Butt.

Other current and former residents of Kitsilano include:

 Robin Blaser, poet
 George Bowering, author
 Sven Butenschön, former ice hockey player
 Chelah Horsdal, actress
 Gregory Henriquez, architect
 Eric Johnson, actor
 Tinsel Korey, actress
 Frank Palmer, businessman, advertising executive (DDB Canada)
 Evelyn Roth, artist
 Michael Saxell, songwriter, musician
 Jack Shadbolt, artist
 Jared Slingerland, producer, musician
 Spirit of the West, folk music group
 Mark Vonnegut, pediatrician, memoirist, son of Kurt Vonnegut Jr.
 Jeff Wall, artist
 Chip Wilson, founder of Lululemon
 Finn Wolfhard, actor, musician, voice actor, filmmaker

See also 
 Seaforth Peace Park
 Senakw
 Squamish Nation
 List of neighbourhoods in Vancouver
 List of Squamish villages

Notes

References

External links 
 
 
 City of Vancouver Neighbourhood Profile
 Kitsilano page, Vancouver Then and Now website, comparisons of older photos with modern locations

 
Neighbourhoods in Vancouver